Geoffrey Arthur Taylor (22 January 1923 – 20 July 2007) was an English professional footballer who played as a winger.

Career
Born in Kessingland, Taylor played in England, France, Switzerland and Germany for CNSOBU, Norwich City, Reading, Lincoln City, Brighton & Hove Albion, Rennes, Bristol Rovers, SC Brühl, Queens Park Rangers and VfR 07 Kirn.

Career statistics

References 

1923 births
2007 deaths
Footballers from Suffolk
English footballers
Association football wingers
Norwich City F.C. players
Reading F.C. players
Lincoln City F.C. players
Brighton & Hove Albion F.C. players
Stade Rennais F.C. players
Bristol Rovers F.C. players
SC Brühl players
Queens Park Rangers F.C. players
English Football League players
English expatriate sportspeople in France
English expatriate sportspeople in Switzerland
English expatriate sportspeople in West Germany
English expatriate footballers
Expatriate footballers in France
Expatriate footballers in Switzerland
Expatriate footballers in West Germany